The 1987 Eastern Illinois Panthers football team represented Eastern Illinois University as a member of the Gateway Collegiate Athletic Conference (GCAC) during  the 1987 NCAA Division I-AA football season. The Panthers played their home games at O'Brien Stadium in Charleston, Illinois. Led by first-year head coach Bob Spoo, Eastern Illinois compiled an overall record of 5–6 with a mark of 3–3 in conference play, tying for third in the GCAC.

Schedule

References

Eastern Illinois
Eastern Illinois Panthers football seasons
Eastern Illinois Panthers football